Siah Kuh (also Romanized as Sīāh Kūh) is a village in Somam Rural District, Rankuh District, Amlash County, Gilan Province, Iran. At the 2006 census, its population was 36, in 9 families.

References 

Populated places in Amlash County